Ring of Elysium is a free-to-play, multiplayer online battle royale game developed by Aurora Studio and published by TCH Scarlet Limited, each a subsidiary of Tencent Games, and is available to download for free on Steam, DMM & Garena. In North America, Europe and parts of Asia it was released on Steam on 19 September 2018 as a free-to-play early access game on the North American servers, and on 25 November 2018 on the European servers.

Plot 
Ring of Elysium is heavily based on its narrative style and deep lore connecting each and everything happening in the game every season. Each season continues the story and adds 3 new characters into the game with each having their own backstories and connections to the events taking place. In Season 1, players are introduced to the snowy mountains of Mt. Dione as they must fight to death till 4 can escape its disastrous snowstorm Ymir. In Season 2, players are introduced into Europa Island, as once again, they fight for guaranteed survival as they attempt to escape from a volcanic eruption and the ash that descends across the map.

Season 1: Arctic Survival 
The story begins with the introduction of three characters from the Elysium universe being Lynn, Hikage and Gavin. In the classic match, 60 people are trapped in a snow mountain-based map "Mt. Dione", assaulted by a disastrous snowstorm Ymir. The way out is a rescue flight which can only save up to four people. Survivors must stay ahead of the approaching storm while eliminating competitors. Players are equipped with a snowboard, climbing gear, or a hang glider, to traverse the snowy terrain and adapt to fights and other intense situations.

Season 2: Paradise Falls 
The story continues with three new characters in Season 2 - Bradley, Sylvia, and Alfonso. 60 people are trapped on a tropical island and the players must escape a cloud of volcanic ash engulfing the area Europa Island. A rescue helicopter will arrive in the final safe zone to rescue four players; time is critical, as the pyroclastic flow eruption is imminent. The classic matches on Europa Island start with a choice of three Traversal modes, the Hang Glider, BMX Bike, and Grappling Hook, the players have to use the 3 choices and survive the volcanic ash as well as fight other players for surviving while keeping an eye on the toxic gases and ash from the volcano. As the match progresses and failing to stay away from the ash storm leads to a painful and swift death from the toxic gases.

Season 3: Storm The Europa 
The story continues and another three characters enter the Elysium Universe - Captain Fokke, Elliot and Saki. The core gameplay remains the same, with the addition of a pirate ship making things interesting. During every round, after the dynamic weather system of ROE[Ring Of Elysium] went into "Typhoon" mode, a cursed pirate ship appears on the map. While the ship is moving, loot boxes (pirate barrels) are being continuously thrown off the ship as an extra source of high tier loot or new tactical items like a DPV. Later in the season underwater treasure hunting and exploring the secret ruins of an ancient civilization found deep under the waters around Europa Island were added to the gameplay.

Development 
Ring of Elysium is a re-development of an earlier game called Europa. The game is developed with Tencent Games's QuickSilverX engine.

The game underwent a closed beta test phase on Garena Launcher which was set to end at 10 July 2018 for its Thailand server, and 4 June 2018 for its Indonesian server.

The game was released to Steam for early access in North America on 19 September 2018, proceeding with 20 September 2018 for Asia, and 25 September 2018 for Europe.

Legal Issues 
In January 2019, a model named Mei Yan posted to her twitter account about the game using her likeness without permission, along with images showing the similarities between promotional images for the character and a 2015 post on Yan's instagram. The character was removed soon after, though possibly only due to the ending of Season 1.

References

External links 
 Official site (Thailand)
 Official site (Indonesia)
Official site (Europe)

Battle royale games
Multiplayer video games
Survival video games
Tactical shooter video games
Third-person shooters
Video games developed in China
Windows games
Windows-only games
2018 video games
Garena games